The NWA Southern Heavyweight Championship is a title controlled by, and defended in NWA Southern All-Star Wrestling.

Southern All-star Wrestling created the SAW Southern Heavyweight Championship in 2010 then later changed its name to the NWA Southern Heavyweight Championship in December 2012 after SAW joined the NWA (National Wrestling Alliance) under the all new NWA SAW Branding.

Title history

References

National Wrestling Alliance championships